Sajjad Nadri (born 28 May 1990) is an Iranian handball player for Samen Sabzevar and the Iranian national team.

References

1990 births
Living people
Iranian male handball players
People from Lorestan Province
Iranian expatriate sportspeople in Turkey
21st-century Iranian people